"It's Not That Easy" is the first single taken from British R&B singer Lemar's third album The Truth About Love.

Before the single's release, "It's Not That Easy" made the top 3 of the UK radio airplay chart and the top 10 of the TV airplay chart. The week prior to the single's physical release, "It's Not That Easy" entered the top 75 at #41 on downloads alone. In its second week on the chart, once the physical CD and vinyl formats were in store, the single launched Lemar back into the top ten of the UK singles chart, after his previous single, "Don't Give It Up", peaked outside the top twenty. "It's Not That Easy" peaked at #7.

"It's not that easy" was first released in norwegian with the title "Eventyrlandet" (Fairytale land) that Fredrik Friis composed for the child artist Eivind Løberg in the 1970s.

Track listings

 CD: 1

 "It's Not That Easy" (Album Version)
 "Come On Over"

 CD: 2

 "It's Not That Easy" (Album Version)
 "It's Not That Easy" (Kardinal Beats Remix)
 "It's Not That Easy" (5am Extended Remix)
 "It's Not That Easy" (CD-ROM Video)

 12" Vinyl

Side A
 "It's Not That Easy" (Kardinal Beats Remix)
 "It's Not That Easy" (Kardinal Beats Remix Instrumental)

Side B
 "It's Not That Easy" (5am Extended Remix)
 "It's Not That Easy" (Album Version)

Credits & Personnel 
 Writer - DEEKAY  Lars Halvor Jensen  Martin Larsson  Ali Tennant  Fredrik Friis  Sigurd Jansen  Glenn Tharaldsen
 Producer - Brian Rawling  Paul Meehan
 Mixer - Steve Fitzmaurice

Charts

References

2006 singles
Lemar songs
Songs written by Lars Halvor Jensen
Songs written by Ali Tennant
Songs written by Martin M. Larsson
2006 songs
Song recordings produced by Brian Rawling